Monstrosus, monstrous in Latin may refer to:
 Penicillium monstrosum, a synonym for Penicillium brevicompactum, a mold species
 a cultivar of Leopoldia comosa, the tassel hyacinth
 a cultivar of Xerochrysum bracteatum, the golden everlasting

See also
 Monstrosus